The Embassy of the Republic of China (Taiwan) in the Kingdom of Eswatini is the embassy of the Republic of China (ROC; commonly called Taiwan) in Mbabane, Eswatini. The two countries have had diplomatic relations since Eswatini's independence in 1968. 

Eswatini is one of the 15 countries that recognise the ROC. As of 2019, it is the only country in Africa which does not have diplomatic relations with the People's Republic of China. 

Until 2014, it was one of only four diplomatic missions in the country, along with the United States Embassy and the South African and Mozambique High Commissions. However, Qatar has also established an embassy in Mbabane.

The Embassy also has responsibility for Mozambique. However, it is not accredited to Maputo, as Mozambique has maintained diplomatic relations with the People's Republic of China since its independence from Portugal in 1975. 

Its counterpart body in Taiwan is the Embassy of Eswatini in Taipei.

See also
Eswatini–Taiwan relations
List of diplomatic missions of Taiwan
List of diplomatic missions in Eswatini
Taipei Economic and Cultural Representative Office

References

Eswatini
Taiwan
Eswatini–Taiwan relations